Nueva Palmira is a city in Colonia Department in south-western Uruguay.

Geography

History 
A "Pueblo" (village) named "Higueritas" was founded here on 26 October 1831 by Felipe Santiago Torres Leiva. Its status was elevated to "Villa" (town) by the Act of Ley Nº 7.257 on 17 August 1920 and then to "Ciudad" (city) by the Act of Ley Nº 11961 on 1 July 1953. The city got its name from the ancient city of Palmira in Syria (Aramaic for City of Date Trees).

Population
In 2011 Nueva Palmira had a population of 9,857.
 
Source: Instituto Nacional de Estadística de Uruguay

Features 
Nueva Palmira is considered the second most important commercial port in Uruguay after the Port of Montevideo and offers docking facility for yachts. There are several beaches along its shore, like Playa Higuerita, Playa Eolo, Playa Corbacho and Playa Los Vascos, while the northern end of the city, along the shore, is a resort called Balneario Brisas del Uruguay.

Main streets and squares 
The main streets are General J.G. Artigas and fellipe Fontana, both running SE to NW, converge at the southeastern end of town and join with Ruta 21 towards Carmelo. The other main street, Chile, runs SW to NE and extends to Ruta 21 towards Dolores and Mercedes of Soriano Department.

The main squares of the city are Plaza de los 33 Patriotas, which takes up two blocks and extends to the Muelle Viejo (Old Dock) at the waterfront, and Plaza Artigas, featuring a monument to José Gervasio Artigas and the main church of the city. There is also Plaza de Deportes which offers open doors sports facilities. The city has also a zoological garden in its northern part.

Places of worship
 Our Lady of Remedies Parish Church (Roman Catholic)

Government 
The city mayor as of July 2010 is Andrés Passarino.

Notable people 
Wilson Graniolatti, football player.
Gianni Guigou, football player.
Sergio Rochet, football player.

See also 
 Geography of Uruguay#The Littoral

References

External links 
 Nueva Palmira's website 
 Information on the city at welcomeuruguay.com 
 INE map of Nueva Palmira

Populated places in the Colonia Department
Populated places established in 1831
Argentina–Uruguay border crossings
Port cities and towns in Uruguay